James A. Isenberg (born 1951) is an American theoretical physicist and mathematician, professor emeritus at the University of Oregon.

Personal life and education 
Isenberg was born in 1951.  He became an Eagle Scout in 1966, and in 1969 graduated from Plymouth-Whitemarsh High School in Plymouth Meeting, Pennsylvania.

When he ran the Boston Marathon at age 18, The Philadelphia Inquirer reported he "is 5 feet 1 inch tall, weighs 95 pounds and looks about 13." He wore his birth certificate pinned to his jersey to prove his age. Isenberg says he has "completed 143 marathons, including 30 Boston Marathons."

At Princeton University he graduated with an A.B. in physics in 1973. He was a graduate student under Charles Misner at the University of Maryland, and he earned Ph.D. in physics in 1979, with his dissertation, Construction of Spacetimes from Initial Data.

In Australia in 2017, Isenberg was standing in the ocean when a wave knocked him over, injuring his spinal cord and leaving him paralyzed from the neck down. He has been recovering with therapy at Magee Rehabilitation Hospital in Philadelphia. In 2019 at the Princeton alumni parade, he "led his class down the route in a wheelchair".

Isenberg lives in Philadelphia, Pennsylvania, with his wife, economist Pauline Kennedy.

Career 
Isenberg is one of the pioneers in the study of the constraint equations in classical general relativity. His many important contributions include the completion of the solution theory of the constraint equations on closed manifolds with constant mean curvature, and with his collaborators, the first nontrivial results on the non-constant mean curvature case.

From 1973 to 1979, Isenberg held positions in the physics department at the University of Maryland. Between 1979 and 1982 he held a postdoctoral fellow positions in the applied mathematics department of the University of Waterloo and the mathematics department at the University of California, Berkeley.

Isenberg joined the mathematics department faculty at the University of Oregon in 1982 and in 2021 became a professor emeritus of mathematics at the University of Oregon.

Recognition
Isenberg was elected a Fellow of the American Physical Society in 2000, cite "For his pioneering work on global issues in general relativity and for his contributions to the field."

He was named to the 2021 class of fellows of the American Mathematical Society "for contributions to mathematical general relativity and geometry flows".

Selected works
The Ricci Flow: Techniques and Applications: Part IV: Long-Time Solutions and Related Topics, American Math Society, (2015)

References

External links 

  (video, 1:01:12 hours)
  (video, 38:43 minutes)
  (video, 14:40 minutes)
  (video, 1:00:00 hour)

21st-century American physicists
American relativity theorists
University of Maryland, College Park alumni
University of Oregon faculty
Living people
People from Brownsville, Oregon
Fellows of the American Mathematical Society
1951 births
Fellows of the American Physical Society